Nicholas Michael Pratto (born October 6, 1998) is an American professional baseball first baseman for the Kansas City Royals of Major League Baseball (MLB). He made his MLB debut in 2022.

Amateur career
Pratto grew up in Huntington Beach, California, and played for their Little League Baseball team in the 2011 Little League World Series. Huntington Beach made it to the championship game against Japan, and Pratto hit a walk-off single to win the championship. In 2015, he played for Team USA at the 18-and-under Baseball World Cup.

Pratto attended Mater Dei High School in Santa Ana, California, for his first two years of high school before transferring to Huntington Beach High School in Huntington Beach. At Huntington Beach, he was teammates with Hagen Danner. As a senior in 2017, he hit .330 with nine home runs and 22 RBIs. He committed to the University of Southern California (USC) to play college baseball.

Professional career

Pratto was considered one of the top prospects for the 2017 Major League Baseball draft. He was selected by the Kansas City Royals with the 14th overall pick in the draft. He signed with the Royals, bypassing his commitment to USC for a $3.45 million signing bonus, and  made his professional debut with the Arizona League Royals of the Rookie-level Arizona League, posting a .247 batting average with four home runs, 34 RBIs and ten stolen bases over 52 games. He spent 2018 with the Lexington Legends of the Class A South Atlantic League, slashing .280/.343/.443 with 14 home runs, 62 RBIs, and 22 stolen bases over 127 games.

Pratto spent the 2019 season with the Wilmington Blue Rocks of the Class A-Advanced Carolina League. Over 124 games, he slashed .191/.278/.310 with nine home runs and 46 RBIs. Pratto did not play in a game in 2020 due to the cancellation of the Minor League Baseball season because of the COVID-19 pandemic.

Pratto began the 2021 season with the Northwest Arkansas Naturals of Double-A Central. In June, Pratto was selected to play in the All-Star Futures Game. He was promoted to the Omaha Storm Chasers of Triple-A West in mid-July. Over 124 games between the two teams, Pratto slashed .265/.385/.602 with 36 home runs, 98 RBIs, 28 doubles, and 12 stolen bases. His 36 home runs were second in the minor leagues behind teammate MJ Melendez. Following the season, he was awarded the Minor League Gold Glove Award as the best-fielding first baseman at any level of Minor League Baseball.

The Royals selected Pratto to their 40-man roster following the season on November 19, 2021, to protect him from becoming eligible in the Rule 5 draft. He began the 2022 season with Omaha and was promoted to the major leagues to make his major league debut on July 14. He recorded his first MLB hit on July 15 versus Alek Manoah of the Toronto Blue Jays at Rogers Centre with a single in the fifth inning. On July 17, Pratto hit his first career home run, a solo shot off of Toronto starter José Berríos.

References

External links

1998 births
Living people
Sportspeople from Huntington Beach, California
Baseball players from California
Major League Baseball first basemen
Kansas City Royals players
Arizona League Royals players
Lexington Legends players
Wilmington Blue Rocks players
Northwest Arkansas Naturals players
Omaha Storm Chasers players